Mestia is a highland townlet (daba) in northwest Georgia, at an elevation of   in the Caucasus Mountains.

General information
Mestia and the adjoining 132 villages form Mestia District (raioni). It was granted the status of a townlet (Georgian: daba) in 1968.

Historically and ethnographically, Mestia has always been regarded a chief community of Zemo, or Upper Svaneti province. It was formerly known as Seti (სეტი). The population is mostly Svans, a cultural and linguistic subgroup of the Georgians. Despite its small size, the townlet was an important centre of Georgian culture for centuries and contains a number of medieval monuments, such as churches and forts, included in a list of UNESCO World Heritage Sites.

Mestia is served by the Queen Tamar Airport, which is operated by the state-owned company United Airports of Georgia, since 2010.

Architecture and attractions
The townlet is dominated by stone defensive towers of a type seen in Ushguli and Mestia proper ("Svan towers"). A typical Svan fortified dwelling consisted of a tower, an adjacent house (machubi) and some other household structures encircled by a defensive wall.

Unique icons and manuscripts are kept in Mestia Historical-Ethnographic Museum. Mestia is also a centre of mountaineering tourism.

Twin towns

Born in Mestia
 Mikheil Khergiani (1932–1969), a mountain climber

See also
 Samegrelo-Zemo Svaneti
 Tviberi Glacier
 Administrative divisions of Georgia (country)
 Lists of World Heritage Sites#Asia

References

External links

 
  Frescos and icons from Svaneti

Cities and towns in Samegrelo-Zemo Svaneti
Populated places in Mestia Municipality
Kutaisi Governorate
Svaneti
Ski areas and resorts in Georgia (country)